Lac de la Vogealle is a lake in Haute-Savoie, France. It is located below the Dents Blanches and nearby the Cirque de Sixt-Fer-à-Cheval at an elevation of 2001 m. The lake's surface area varies seasonally. It is surrounded by several glaciers the Prazon glacier en the Ruan glacier as well as the Tenneverge Peak.

Vogealle, Lac